Sutton Manor may refer to:

 St John's Jerusalem, also known as Sutton Manor, Kent, UK
 Sutton Manor Colliery, Sutton, St Helens, Merseyside, UK
 Sutton Manor School, London, UK
 Sutton Manor (New Rochelle), a neighborhood in the city of New Rochelle, Westchester County, New York, US